Martina Di Giuseppe (born 10 February 1991) is an Italian tennis player.

Di Giuseppe achieved her career-high singles ranking of world No. 149 on 22 July 2019, after making the semifinals at the Bucharest Open. Also on 22 July 2019, she peaked at No. 338 in the WTA doubles rankings.

Di Giuseppe has won seven singles and six doubles titles on tournaments of the ITF Women's Circuit.

Grand Slam singles performance timeline

ITF Circuit finals

Singles: 15 (7 titles, 8 runner–ups)

Doubles: 14 (6 titles, 8 runner–ups)

References

External links
 

1991 births
Living people
Italian female tennis players